Catacanthus ("having downward-pointing thorns") is a genus of insects within the family Pentatomidae. The insects belonging to this genus are found in Madagascar, India, Sri Lanka, Myanmar, Thailand, China, Indonesia, Malaysia, Philippines, Papua New Guinea, New Caledonia, Japan and South Korea.

Species 

Species include:

References 

Pentatominae
Pentatomomorpha genera
Arthropods of Asia
Taxa named by Maximilian Spinola